Let the Little Ones Come to Me (German: Lasset die Kleinen zu mir kommen) is a 1920 Austrian silent film directed by Max Neufeld and starring Neufeld. Liane Haid and Karl Ehmann.

Cast
 Max Neufeld as Johann Schindler, Pfarrer 
 Josephine Josephi as seine Mutter 
 Liane Haid as Marei 
 Lisl Günther as Toni Hellmer 
 Karl Ehmann as Veidt 
 Josef Bergauer
 Max Brebeck
 Polly Einhart
 Marietta Feldmann
 Thea Goll
 Josef Recht

References

Bibliography
 Parish, Robert. Film Actors Guide. Scarecrow Press, 1977.

External links

1920 films
Austrian silent feature films
Films directed by Max Neufeld
Austrian black-and-white films